The Khmer Will Party (KWP) is a Cambodian political party founded in 2018. Its president is Kong Monika. It came fourth in the 2018 general election, but did not win any seats.

Recent electoral history

References

External links

2018 establishments in Cambodia
Liberal parties in Cambodia
Nationalist parties in Cambodia
Political parties established in 2018
Political parties in Cambodia
Populist parties